Astele armillata is a species of sea snail, a marine gastropod mollusk in the family Calliostomatidae.

Description
The length of this shell varies between 25 mm and 38 mm. The shell has a strictly conical shape. It is carinated, imperforate, and thin but rather solid. It is very pale yellowish or pinkish, with irregular, rather pale vertical bands of light yellowish-brown, often broken into maculations, and radiating on the base. The surface is shining, with numerous spiral granose lirae. There are seven lirae on the penultimate whorl, on the antepenultimate, and on the upper surface of the body whorl. And sometimes these three whorls (or the last one) show interstitial threads between the granose lirae. The flat base of the shell has 12 or 13 concentric lirae, the several inner ones stronger, decidedly beaded, the 3 or 4 outer more separated, less beaded. The angular periphery is formed of a double beaded ridge, and on some specimens this projects a little at the sutures of the spire. The spire is conic, elevated, with straight lateral outlines. 
The shell contains nine whorls. The smooth apex is subacute. The two earlier whorls follow the apical are trilirate. The body whorl is angular at periphery, flat beneath, indented in the center around the insertion of the columella. The aperture is rhomboidal, oblique, angled on the outer part, above the angle thickened inside by a heavy callus or pearly submarginal deposit. The columella is oblique, arcuate and a trifle toothed at base.

Distribution
This marine species occurs off New South Wales, off Western Australia and off Tasmania

References

 Hombron J.B. & Jacquinot H. (1848 [November]). Atlas d'Histoire Naturelle. Zoologie par MM. Hombron et Jacquinot, chirurgiens de l'expédition. in: Voyage au Pôle Sud et dans l'Océanie sur les corvettes l'Astrolabe et la Zélée pendant les années 1837-1838-1839-1840 sous le commandement de M. Dumont-D'Urville capitaine de vaisseau publié sous les auspices du département de la marine et sous la direction supérieure de M. Jacquinot, capitaine de Vaisseau, commandant de La Zélée. Vingt-cinquiéme livraison. Mollusques pls 14, 16, 19, 22; Insectes lépidoptéres pl. 3.

External links
 Philippi, R. A. (1849). Centuria altera testaceorum novorum. Zeitschrift für Malakozoologie. 5(7): 99-112
 Adams, A. (1855). Further contribution towards the natural history of the Trochidae: with the description of a new genus and several new species, from the Cumingian collection. Proceedings of the Zoological Society of London. (1854) 22: 37-41, pl. 27
 To Encyclopedia of Life
 To World Register of Marine Species
 
 To Jeweled Top Shell (Astele armillata) - Tomahawk, Tasmania
 To A Guide to the Seashells and other Marine Molluscs of Tasmania web-site

armillata
Gastropods described in 1828